Balram Das (born 7 March 1931) is an Indian politician. He was a Member of Parliament, representing Madhya Pradesh in the Rajya Sabha the upper house of India's Parliament as a member of the Indian National Congress.

References

Rajya Sabha members from Madhya Pradesh
Indian National Congress politicians
1931 births
Living people
Indian National Congress politicians from Madhya Pradesh